Cheiracanthium macedonicum is a spider species found in Bulgaria and North Macedonia.

See also 
 List of Eutichuridae species

References

External links 

macedonicum
Spiders of Europe
Spiders described in 1921